The Beneteau First 265 is a French sailboat, that was designed by Group Finot and first built in 1990.

The Beneteau First 265 design was developed into the Beneteau Oceanis 281 in 1995.

Production
The design was built by Beneteau in France and in the United States. The company built 520 examples between 1990 and 1997, but it is now out of production.

Design
The First 265 is a small recreational keelboat, built predominantly of fiberglass. It has a fractional sloop rig, a slightly raked stem, a reverse transom, an internally-mounted spade-type rudder controlled by a tiller and a fixed fin keel. It displaces  and carries  of ballast.

The boat is fitted with an inboard motor.

See also
List of sailing boat types

Related development
Beneteau Oceanis 281

Similar sailboats
Beneteau First 26
C&C 26
C&C 26 Wave
Contessa 26
Dawson 26
Discovery 7.9
Grampian 26
Hunter 26
Hunter 26.5
Hunter 260
Hunter 270
MacGregor 26
Mirage 26
Nash 26
Nonsuch 26
Outlaw 26
Paceship PY 26
Parker Dawson 26
Pearson 26
Sandstream 26
Tanzer 26
Yamaha 26

References

Sailing yachts
Keelboats
Sailboat types built by Beneteau
Sailboat type designs by Groupe Finot
1990s sailboat type designs